Theodore Boone: The Scandal is the sixth book in the Theodore Boone series written by John Grisham.  It was released May 10, 2016.

Plot summary
The story hinges on standardized testing in middle-grade schools, a matter of contemporary controversy. Teachers in a local middle school have been accused of cheating on the test, and Theodore Boone becomes involved. As he and his eighth-grade classmates are also being tested, the fairness of the test is of particular concern to him.

References

External links

Theodore Boone: The Scandal at Penguin Group

2016 American novels
Novels by John Grisham
American children's novels
2016 children's books
Novels set in high schools and secondary schools
Novels about academic scandals
E. P. Dutton books
Hodder & Stoughton books